Močunigi is a small settlement in the City Municipality of Koper in the Littoral region of Slovenia.

It lies right on the border with Croatia and is not connected by road to any surrounding settlements in Slovenia, only by a path to small villages on the Croatian side. It no longer has any permanent residents.

History
In 1954, when the Free Territory of Trieste was dissolved and Zone B was assigned to Yugoslavia, Močunigi (together with Abitanti, Belvedur, Brezovica pri Gradinu, Gradin, Koromači–Boškini, Pregara, and Sirči) was originally assigned to the Socialist Republic of Croatia. In 1956 these villages were reassigned to the Socialist Republic of Slovenia.

References

External links
Močunigi on Geopedia

Populated places in the City Municipality of Koper
Ghost towns in Europe
Former populated places in Slovenia